The Wadhams Road–Pine River Bridge was a bridge carrying Wadhams Road over the Pine River in Saint Clair Township, Michigan. It was one of the few remaining multiple-span, curved-chord through girder bridges, a type unique to Michigan. The bridge was demolished in 2007.

History
This bridge was a joint product of the Michigan State Highway Department and the St. Clair County Road Commission, with each party paying half. The State Highway Department solicited bids to construct this bridge in mid-1927. They awarded the contract to Walter Toebe and Company of Shingleton, Michigan, for $37,679 (equivalent to $ in ), with an additional cost for cement of $2,791 (equivalent to $ in ). The total cost of the project was $47,971 (equivalent to $ in ).

Description

Each girder contained five openings, with a row of 14 recessed square panels below. The bridge sat on a solid concrete pier with slightly pointed cutwaters on each end.

See also

References

External links
 Photos from HistoricBridges.org

National Register of Historic Places in St. Clair County, Michigan
Infrastructure completed in 1928